Statistics of Nemzeti Bajnokság I in the 1990–91 season.

Overview
It was contested by 16 teams, and Budapest Honvéd FC won the championship. Honvéd's title came as a surprise as they were forced to play the relegation tiebreaker, beating Kazincbarcika 3-2 on aggregate in the previous season. The arrival of newly appointed coach Mezey György, who had been head coach of the Hungarian national team, proved to be a good effect on the club's performance. The method of awarding the winner of a match 3 points was abolished; this time 2 points were given. Szeged and Bp. Volán won promotion while Debrecen maintained their first division status winning 2-1 on aggregate over Dunaújváros in the relegation tiebreaker.

League standings

Results

Relegation play-offs 

|}

Statistical leaders

Top goalscorers

References
Hungary - List of final tables (RSSSF)

Nemzeti Bajnokság I seasons
1
Hun